The Reading 120, Thompson Bucks County Classic and Univest Grand Prix were professional bicycle road races founded in 1998 by former professional cyclist and two time US National Champion John Eustice, and sanctioned by the Union Cycliste Internationale (UCI) – the world governing body of competitive cycling. The races took place in Southeast Pennsylvania beginning with The Univest Grand Prix in  Montgomery County, Pennsylvania, United States from 1999 to 2011, Thompson Bucks County Classic in Bucks County, Pennsylvania, United States 2012 to 2014 and Reading 120 in Berks County, Pennsylvania, United States 2015 and 2016.

The races are noteworthy not just for their sanctioning by the UCI (one of only 13 such events held for men in the United States in 2008), but also for their courses. In addition to the 160 km road races the event expanded in 2004 to include a non-competitive 100 km recreational ride and a criterium of Doylestown, Pennsylvania.

In 2017, the road race portion of the event was cancelled. The criterium in Doylestown continues under the Thompson Bucks County Classic name and now includes a professional women's field and amateur men's and women's fields. The race came under new direction in 2019 after the retirement of John Eustice.

Name of the race
 1998–2011 : Univest Grand Prix
 2012–2014 : Thompson Bucks County Classic
 2015–2016 : Reading 120

Past road race winners

References

External links

Cycle races in the United States
Recurring sporting events established in 1988
1988 establishments in Pennsylvania
Men's road bicycle races
UCI America Tour races
Defunct cycling races in the United States